John O'Connell (born November 13, 1959) is an American television director. He has worked in Dramatic and Music multi-camera television production for over 20 years.

Positions held
100 Centre Street
 Director (2000,2001)
 Associate Director(2000,2001)

Private Sessions

Copshop

Night Music

As the World Turns
 Director (2004-2010)
 Occasional Director (2002-2003)

Guiding Light
 Occasional Director (2003)
 Director (1991-1998)
 Associate Director (1990-1996)

One Life to Live
 Director(1998-2000)
 Occasional Director (2003)

Awards and nominations
Daytime Emmy Award
Win, 2007, Directing Team, As the World Turns (Shared win with Maria Wagner, Michael Eilbaum, Sonia Blangiardo, Jennifer Pepperman, Habib Azar, Christopher Goutman, Michael Kerner, Carol Sedwick, Janet Andrews, James Kowal, Brian Lydell, Jennifer Blood, Nancy Barron, Alexandra Roalsvig, Brett Hellman
General Hospital
Guiding Light
One Life To Live
Win, 2004, Directing Team, Guiding Light
Nomination, 1990-1991, 1993, 2004, Directing Team, Guiding Light

External links

Living people
1959 births
American television directors